Manx Radio (legally Radio Manx Ltd.) is the national commercial radio station for the Isle of Man. It began broadcasting on 29 June 1964, almost ten years before commercial radio was licensed in the United Kingdom. The Isle of Man, having its own government and laws, was not subject to the rules prohibiting commercial broadcasting in the UK. However, the Manx Government still had to apply to the UK's General Post Office for a frequency and for permission to broadcast. First requested in 1960, a licence was eventually granted in May 1964. It was allocated an FM frequency of 89.0 MHz and a comparatively low power of 50 watts. In October 1964, an additional frequency of 1594 kHz AM was allocated to the station to provide greater coverage, although again at a limited power of 50 watts. It broadcasts primarily in English with several hours per week of Manx language programming.

Current frequencies
Manx Radio currently broadcasts on 1368 kHz AM to the whole island; 89.0 MHz (from Snaefell) for the north of the island; 97.2 MHz FM (from Douglas/Carnane) for the south of the island; and 103.7 MHz (from Jurby) for the island's hills. Additional low-power transmitters cover Ramsey and Peel on a frequency of 89.5 MHz.

The station's FM and AM services are also available online.

Financial Income
Manx Radio's commercial revenues in 2018 accounted for over 60% of its revenues. To provide the public service element of its output it received a government subvention of £875,000 as well as government support for its transmission networks and its coverage of the TT.

Company structure
Manx Radio is the island's public service broadcaster. It was originally run by the Isle of Man Broadcasting Commission, a state-owned body, under the name Isle of Man Broadcasting Company. In 1980 the company was moved to an arms-length operation using the name Radio Manx Limited (the on-air name did not change). Since 1994, the shares in Radio Manx Limited have been held by the Manx Radio Trust, further distancing the station from Tynwald. Nevertheless, the company remains responsible to Tynwald and its operations are reviewed annually.

Manx Radio TT
During the Isle of Man TT races, the 1368 kHz frequency becomes Manx Radio TT, providing news and results on the races.  The service is also available on 87.9 FM in Douglas and 100.6 FM in Sulby.  Regulars Chris Williams, Chris Kinley and Marc Tyley can all be heard each day, John Moss presents the Manx Radio TT news bulletins and the commentary team cover the practice and racing sessions.

In May 2012, Radio TT was re-branded as Manx Radio TT 365 to signify that the station was available to listen to throughout the year via the Internet. The service incorporated archive commentary recordings with classic music tracks, as well as the TT fortnight broadcasts. However, after less than a year the service was subsequently closed.

Manx Radio TT recommenced its usual service in May 2013. In 2015 and 2016, the service was broadcast as Vauxhall Radio TT.

Isle of Man TT Radio
In 2019 the traditional race coverage service was broadcast under the name of Isle of Man TT Radio,  under terms agreed by the Department for Enterprise and Manx Radio for the 2019 TT and Festival of Motorcycling.  The agreement resulted the removal of all Manx Radio TT branding from its coverage and the end of it being able to sell its own advertising for race coverage.  The commentary and race coverage carried only an hourly announcement that said ’this service is provided by Manx Radio’.

Radio TT returns for 2022 as part of Manx Radio AM1368: The Best Biking Station in the World and will be broadcast locally on AM & FM around the course and online and Manx Radio Digital.

Manx Radio presenters

Notable presenters
David Callister
Bob Carswell
Jim Caine

Manx Radio news
Manx Radio employs a team of broadcast & digital journalists, responsible for hourly news bulletins, the news orientated Breakfast Show (7:30-9:30am), Mannin Line (noon - 1pm) and Update (5:30 - 6pm). They also produce a range of other shows focussing on news and local politics including 'Perspective' at noon on Sunday and a range of sport updates and shows.

Transmitter reuse
A deal between United Christian Broadcasters (UCB) and Manx Radio saw UCB broadcast via Manx Radio from 5 October 1987 for an hour on a Sunday from 9pm on the AM transmitter.

Since September 2015, Radio Caroline has been broadcasting 'live' for one weekend each month as "Radio Caroline North" (with original DJs and a mixed sixties, seventies and eighties music content and jingles) from its former home the MV Ross Revenge on the Blackwater Estuary in Essex, via Manx Radio's 1368 kHz 20 kW transmitter.

References

External links
 Manx Radio
 UK Radio History

Radio stations in the Isle of Man
Radio stations established in 1964